Drift is the third studio album by American progressive metalcore band Erra. It was released on April 8, 2016 through Sumerian Records and was produced by Nick Sampson. It is the band's first album with former Texas in July vocalist J.T. Cavey.

Track listing

Personnel
Credits retrieved from AllMusic.

Erra
 J.T. Cavey – unclean vocals, backing clean vocals
 Jesse Cash – guitar, bass, clean vocals
 Sean Price – guitar, bass
 Alex Ballew – drums

Additional musicians
 Ryan Arini – background vocals
 Janna and Travis Bobier – background vocals
 Mike Morris – background vocals
 Scott Solomon – background vocals

Additional personnel
 Nick Sampson – production, engineering, mastering, mixing, bass
 Ian Eubanks – composition
 Aaron Marsh – artwork
 Nick Walters – A&R
 Daniel McBride – layout

Charts

References

2016 albums
Erra (band) albums
Sumerian Records albums